Friedl Murauer (born 4 July 1938) is an Austrian hurdler. She competed in the women's 80 metres hurdles at the 1960 Summer Olympics.

References

1938 births
Living people
Athletes (track and field) at the 1960 Summer Olympics
Austrian female hurdlers
Olympic athletes of Austria
Place of birth missing (living people)